Christopher Magnay (1767 – 27 October 1826) was an English merchant who was Lord Mayor of London from 1821–22.

Magnay was a City of London merchant and a member of the Worshipful Company of Merchant Taylors. In 1809, he was elected an alderman of the City of London for Vintry ward. He was Sheriff of London from 1813–14. He was master of the Stationers Company from 1816–17. In 1821, he was elected Lord Mayor of London.

Magnay was the father of William Magnay, who became a baronet.

References

Date of birth missing
1767 births
1826 deaths
19th-century lord mayors of London
19th-century English politicians
Sheriffs of the City of London